Newman Catholic High School is a Roman Catholic high school in Wausau, Wisconsin, United States, in the Diocese of La Crosse.

Background
Newman Catholic was established in 1951. It is the only Catholic high school in Marathon County. The school has a student–teacher ratio of 20:1.

Notable alumni
  Jack Koltes (class of 1960): Notre Dame Fighting Irish men's basketball
 Jim DeLisle (class of 1967): football defensive tackle for the Green Bay Packers; professor of real estate at the University of Washington
 Jerry Petrowski (class of 1968): member of the Wisconsin State Senate, 29th district; former member of the Wisconsin State Assembly
 John H. Robinson (class of 1973): former member of the Wisconsin State Assembly, 85th district

References

External links
 Newman Catholic High School website

 

Roman Catholic Diocese of La Crosse
Catholic secondary schools in Wisconsin
Schools in Marathon County, Wisconsin
Wausau, Wisconsin
Educational institutions established in 1951
Private middle schools in Wisconsin
1951 establishments in Wisconsin